Murray Seafield St George Head (born 5 March 1946) is an English actor and singer. Head has appeared in a number of films, including a starring role as the character Bob Elkin in the Oscar-nominated 1971 film Sunday Bloody Sunday. As a musician, he is most recognised for his international hit songs "Superstar" (from the 1970 rock opera Jesus Christ Superstar) and "One Night in Bangkok" (the 1984 single from the musical Chess, which topped the charts in various countries), and for his 1975 album Say It Ain't So. He has been involved in several projects since the 1960s and continues to record music, perform concerts, and make appearances on television either as himself or as a character actor.

Early life and education
Head was born in London to Seafield Laurence Stewart Murray Head (20 August 1919 – 22 March 2009) and Helen Shingler (29 August 1919 − 8 October 2019). Head's father was a documentary filmmaker for Verity Films. Head's mother played Mme Maigret alongside Rupert Davies in the BBC 1960s television adaptation of the Maigret novels written by Georges Simenon. Head's younger brother Anthony Head is also an actor, best known for playing Rupert Giles in the TV series Buffy the Vampire Slayer.

Head was educated at the Lycée Français Charles de Gaulle in South Kensington, London and Hampton School in Hampton, Middlesex. He attended Chiswick Polytechnic (A level college) in the early 1960s.

Career
Head began writing songs as a child, and by the mid-1960s he had a London-based recording contract. He briefly appeared as one of the hosts of the Bristol-based television pop show Now! alongside Michael Palin. He had limited success, until asked by Tim Rice and Andrew Lloyd Webber to play Judas Iscariot on the original concept album version of Jesus Christ Superstar; at the time, he had been appearing in the West End production of the musical Hair. With the Trinidad Singers, the song "Superstar" peaked at No. 14 on the Billboard Hot 100 chart in 1971.

He made his film debut in The Family Way (1966), which featured Hayley Mills, Hywel Bennett and John Mills in the leading roles. Head won a leading role in the Oscar-nominated film Sunday Bloody Sunday (1971), alongside Peter Finch and Glenda Jackson. Despite these successes, he received little public attention in the next ten years (except for his single release, "Say It Ain't So, Joe" in 1975, which has been covered by The Who's lead vocalist, Roger Daltrey, among others, including The Hollies). "Never Even Thought" has been covered by both Colin Blunstone and Cliff Richard.

In 1973, he appeared in a radio drama, The Fourth Tower of Inverness. In 1979, Head appeared in the miniseries Prince Regent and the final episode of the ITV program Return of the Saint.

Head reappeared in the spotlight in 1984 as the American on the concept album for the musical Chess. The song "One Night in Bangkok" featured Head on lead vocals, affecting a New York accent. It became the last significant Broadway/West End number to be a hit single on American and German radio until "No Matter What"  by Boyzone in 1996. "One Night in Bangkok" was a success in both Europe and North America. Head performed the role of world chess champion Frederick "Freddie" Trumper in the London West End stage production of Chess that premiered on 14 May 1986. The show ran in London until 8 April 1989; during its run, Head departed with vocal strain.

After that, Head had little recording success in the UK or the United States. This fact would later be underscored in a radio segment featured on The Kevin and Bean Show on KROQ-FM in Los Angeles, in which the hosts would phone Head in the morning to find out "What's Up with Murray Head?" Fluent in French, he has released a number of albums in that language. A duet with Marie Carmen, "Une femme un homme", was released in 1993 and was a hit in French-speaking Canada.

In 1999, Head co-wrote the screenplay to Les Enfants du Siècle.

He has appeared on television in the UK on The Bill, Casualty, North Square and Judge John Deed. He also played an artist, and love interest of Gina Ward, called Jack Hollins on ITV's Heartbeat from 2005 to 2006. On 15 March 2010 he appeared in the BBC drama Doctors playing a pop singer, Pete Perry, trying to make a comeback, in which Head sang Robert Johnson's "Love in Vain". He appeared in Doctors again on 18 April 2019 as a different character, a drummer named Brian 'Sticky' Burns. In Canada, he was part of the cast of the 2002 television mini-series Music-Hall, which played on the Radio-Canada network. In 2011 he appeared in the first episode of the series Vera (episode "Hidden Depths") as Peter Calvert.

He played in series 4, episode 3 of the TV series Boon, shown in 1989.
Head's picture appeared on the album cover of The Smiths' compilation album Stop Me, taken from a still of the film The Family Way.

Personal life
Head married Susan Ellis Jones in 1972; they divorced in 1992. He has two daughters: Katherine and Sophie. Sophie sometimes sings with her father, for example on songs such as "Seras-tu là?" on the album Tête à tête and "Make It Easy" from the Emotions album. Head married Lindy Ross (née Newton) on 14 February 2019.

Discography

Nigel Lived (1972)
Say It Ain't So (1976)
Between Us (1979)
Voices (1981)
Shade (1982)
Restless (1984)
Sooner or Later (1986)
Wave (1992)
Pipe Dreams (1995)
Tête à tête (2007)
Rien n'est écrit (2008)
My Back Pages (2012)

Selected filmography
 1966: The Family Way - Geoffrey Fitton
 1967: Two Weeks in September (À cœur joie) - Dickinson's assistant
 1971: Aphrousa - Nicholas
 1971: Sunday Bloody Sunday - Bob Elkin
 1972:  - Tony
 1973: Gawain and the Green Knight - Sir Gawain
 1975: El poder del deseo - Javier
 1977: The French Woman (Madame Claude) - David Evans
 1987: White Mischief (Sur la route de Nairobi) - Lizzie
 1996: Beaumarchais - Lord Rochford
 1999: The Big Snake of the World (Le Grand Serpent du monde) - Tom
 2003: I, Cesar (Moi César, 10 ans 1/2, 1m39) - Mr. Fitzpatrick
 2014: Horsehead - Jim
 2017: Doctors (2 episodes) – Ralphy Aspden

See also
List of artists who reached number one on the Australian singles chart
List of show business families
List of sibling pairs

Notes

References

External links
 
 Hugh Schofield, "Murray Head: 'Unsung at home, but a hero in France'", BBC News, 24 December 2021

1946 births
Living people
Male actors from London
English male musical theatre actors
English male film actors
English male singers
Island Records artists
A&M Records artists
People educated at Hampton School
People educated at Lycée Français Charles de Gaulle
Singers from London
20th-century English male actors
20th-century English singers
21st-century English singers
20th-century British male singers
21st-century British male singers